Chironex fleckeri, commonly known as the Australian box jelly, and nicknamed the sea wasp, is a species of extremely venomous box jellyfish found in coastal waters from northern Australia and New Guinea to Malaysia, the Philippines and  Vietnam. It has been described as "the most lethal jellyfish in the world", with at least 64 known deaths in Australia from 1884 to 2021.

Being stung commonly results in excruciating pain, and if the sting area is significant, an untreated victim may die in two to five minutes. The amount of venom in one animal is said to be enough to kill 60 adult humans.

Taxonomy
Chironex fleckeri was named after North Queensland toxicologist and radiologist Doctor Hugo Flecker. "On January 20, 1955, when a 5-year-old boy died after being stung in shallow water at Cardwell, North Queensland, Flecker found three types of jellyfish. One was an unidentified box-shaped jellyfish with groups of tentacles arising from each corner. Flecker sent it to Dr. Ronald Southcott in Adelaide, and on December 29, 1955, Southcott published his article introducing it as a new genus and species of lethal box jellyfish. He named it Chironex fleckeri, the name being derived from the centaur Chiron in Greek mythology, whose name is derived from the Latin form chiro meaning "hand", the Latin nex meaning "murder", and "fleckeri" in honour of its discoverer. The "hand of death" referring to the four appendages of C. fleckeri appearing as hands.

Description

Chironex fleckeri is the largest of the cubozoans (collectively called box jellyfish), many of which may carry similarly toxic venom. Its bell usually reaches about 16 cm in diameter but can grow up to 35 cm. From each of the four corners of the bell trails a cluster of 15 tentacles. The pale blue bell has faint markings; viewed from certain angles, it bears a somewhat eerie resemblance to a human head or skull. Since it is virtually transparent, the creature is nearly impossible to see in its habitat, posing significant danger to swimmers.

The tentacles are covered with a high concentration of stinging cells called cnidocytes, which are activated by pressure and a chemical trigger; they react to proteinous chemicals. Box jellyfish are day hunters; at night they are seen resting on the ocean floor.

In common with other box jellyfish, C. fleckeri has four eye-clusters with 24 eyes. Some of these eyes seem capable of forming images, but whether they exhibit any object recognition or object tracking is debated; it is also unknown how they process information from their sense of touch and eye-like light-detecting structures due to their lack of a central nervous system. They are attracted to light of different colors (white, red, orange, yellow, green and blue), but blue light seems to elicit a feeding behavior, as it slows down their pulsation rate and makes them stream out their tentacles. Black objects, on the other hand, cause them to move away.

Chironex fleckeri lives on a diet of prawns and small fish and are prey to turtles, whose thick skin is impenetrable to the cnidocytes of the jellyfish.

Distribution and habitat
The medusa is pelagic and has been documented from coastal waters of Australia and New Guinea north to the Philippines and Vietnam. In Australia, it is known from the northern coasts from Exmouth to Agnes Water, but its full distribution outside Australia has not been properly identified. To further confuse, the closely related and also dangerously venomous Chironex yamaguchii was first described from Japan in 2009. This species has also been documented from the Philippines, meaning the non-Australian records of C. fleckeri need to be rechecked. Breeding occurs in lower levels of rivers and mangrove channels.

Sting
Chironex fleckeri is best known for its extremely powerful and occasionally fatal "sting". The sting can produce an excruciating pain accompanied by an intense burning sensation, like being branded with a red hot iron. In Australia, fatalities are most often caused by the larger specimens of C. fleckeri.

In Australia, C. fleckeri has caused at least 64 deaths since the first report in 1883, but most encounters appear to result only in mild envenomation. Among 225 analyzed C. fleckeri stings in Australia's Top End from 1991 to 2004, only 8% required hospital admission, 5% received antivenom and there was a single fatality (a 3-year-old child). 26% experienced severe pain, while it was moderate to none in the remaining. Most deaths in recent decades have been children, as their smaller body mass puts them at a higher risk of fatal envenomation. When people do die, it is usually caused by a cardiac arrest occurring within minutes of the sting. It takes approximately 3 m (10 ft) of tentacle to deliver the fatal dose.

The venom causes cells to become porous enough to allow potassium leakage, causing hyperkalemia, which can lead to cardiovascular collapse and death as quickly as within two to five minutes with an LD50 of 0.04 mg/kg. It was postulated that a zinc compound may be developed as an antidote. Occasionally, swimmers who get stung will undergo cardiac arrest or drown before they can even get back to the shore or boat.

Chironex fleckeri and other jellyfish, including the Irukandji (Carukia barnesi), are abundant in the waters of northern Australia during the warmer months of the year. They are believed to drift into estuaries to breed. Signs like the one pictured are erected along the coast of North Queensland to warn people of such, and few people swim during this period. Some people still do, however, putting themselves at great risk. At popular swimming spots, net enclosures are placed out in the water wherein people can swim but jellyfish cannot get in, keeping swimmers safe.

History of sting treatment
Until 2005, treatment involved using pressure immobilisation bandages, with the aim of preventing distribution of the venom through the lymph and blood circulatory systems. This treatment is no longer recommended by health authorities, due to research which showed that using bandages to achieve tissue compression provoked nematocyst discharge.

The application of vinegar is recommended treatment because vinegar (4–6% acetic acid) permanently deactivates undischarged nematocysts, preventing them from opening and releasing venom. A 2014 study demonstrated in vitro that while vinegar deactivates unfired nematocysts, there was also an increase in venom concentration in the solution, possibly by causing already-fired nematocysts (which still contain some venom) to release what remained. However, this study has been criticized on several methodological grounds, including that the experiment was done using a model membrane that is much different from (and more simple than) human skin. Also, the researchers did not determine whether the increase in venom concentration was caused by already-discharged nematocysts releasing more venom, or if the venom that was released initially had simply leaked back out through the membrane, thus confounding the concentration measurement. Despite these concerns, diluted acetic acid is still the recommended treatment.

References

External links

 
 
 Distribution of Box Jellyfish in Australia 

Chirodropidae
Animals described in 1956
Cnidarians of Australia